Yam Madar (born ) is an Israeli  jebac of KK Crvena Zvezda,and professional basketball player for Partizan Belgrade of the Serbian KLS, the Adriatic League and the EuroLeague. He also represents the Israel senior national team internationally.

He joined Hapoel Tel Aviv of the Israeli Premier League in 2018. He debuted for their senior team in 2018, at age 17, becoming one of the youngest players in club history. Two years later, he became the youngest player to ever win the Israeli Premier League Most Improved Player. He has won a gold medal for Israel at the youth level, playing at the 2019 FIBA U20 European Championship. Madar also has earned a spot in the All-Tournament Team. 

Madar was selected with the 47th overall pick by the Boston Celtics in the 2020 NBA draft.

Early life
Madar was born and raised in the town of Beit Dagan, Israel, to a family of Mizrahi Jewish (Yemenite-Jewish) descent. His father Zohar Madar is a former mayor of Beit Dagan, Israel. In Hebrew, his first name means "sea".

Madar played for Maccabi Beit Dagan and Hapoel Tel Aviv youth teams.

Professional career

Hapoel Tel Aviv (2018–2021)
On 24 June 2018, Madar signed a four-year deal with Hapoel Tel Aviv. On 21 September 2018, he made his debut in a FIBA Champions League qualifying round match against Spirou Charleroi, playing 15 minutes off the bench.

On 3 July 2020, Madar recorded a career-high 28 points, shooting 11-of-17 from the field and 3-of-3 from the line in a 106–105 loss to Maccabi Ashdod. In the quarter-finals series versus league leaders, Maccabi Tel Aviv, Madar was the leading scorer with 17.3 points while shooting 45% FG and 89% FT. He added 5.3 assists, 3.0 rebounds, and 2.0 steals, but despite his performance, Maccabi won 2–1. In Hapoel's only win of the series, he had 22 points, shooting 8-of-16 from the field and 5-of-5 from the line. He added 6 assists and 5 rebounds. On 26 July, Madar was selected as the Israeli Basketball Premier League Most Improved Player. In 2020, Madar was the youngest player to ever win the Israeli Premier League Most Improved Player. In 2021 he was named to the All-League Second Team.

Partizan (2021–2023)
On August 18, 2021, he signed with Partizan Belgrade of the ABA League.

NBA draft rights 
Madar was selected with the 47th overall pick in the 2020 NBA draft by the Boston Celtics, however he continued with Hapoel for the 2020–21 season. He played for the Celtics in the 2021 NBA summer league, scoring 8 points on 4-6 shooting in 17-minutes at his debut, a 85-83 win against the Atlanta Hawks.

National team career

Junior national team
In July 2018, Madar participated at the 2018 FIBA Europe Under-18 Championship Division B with the Israeli Under-18 team, and averaged 11.4 points, 3.3 rebounds, 3 assists, and 1.8 steals per game.

In July 2019, Madar won the 2019 FIBA Europe Under-20 Championship with the Israeli Under-20 team. Madar led the tournament in assists with 7.7 per game, along with 15.9 points, 3.1 rebounds, and 1.4 steals for 19.6 PIR per game, earning a spot in the All-Tournament Team, alongside his teammate Deni Avdija.

Senior national team 
In February 2019, Madar was named to the Israel senior national basketball team.

See also
List of Jews in sports
List of Israelis

References

External links
 Israeli Basketball Premier League profile

2000 births
Living people
ABA League players
Sportspeople from Central District (Israel)
Boston Celtics draft picks
Hapoel Tel Aviv B.C. players
Israeli Jews
Israeli expatriate basketball people in Serbia
Israeli men's basketball players
Israeli people of Yemeni-Jewish descent
Jewish men's basketball players
KK Partizan players
Israeli Mizrahi Jews
Point guards